Nephrophyllidium is a monotypic genus of aquatic flowering plants in the family Menyanthaceae. The sole species is Nephrophyllidium crista-galli. They are wetland plants with basal reniform and crenate leaves. Flowers are five-parted and white, and the petals are adorned with lateral wings and a midline keel. Nephrophyllidium is most nearly related to Menyanthes, which is very similar in habit. The genus name is derived from the kidney-shaped leaves ( = kidney and phyllon = leaf), and the specific epithet refers to the curled petal edges ( = cockscomb).

Nephrophyllidium crista-galli is found in the Pacific Northwest of America, and in Japan, where it can be called subspecies japonicum (Franch.) Yonek. & H.Ohashi. Nephrophyllidium is commonly known as deer cabbage.

The IAPT determined that a prior synonym for the genus, Fauria Franch., too closely resembled the genus Faurea (Proteaceae), and thus conserved Nephrophyllidium as the accepted genus name.

References

Menyanthaceae
Monotypic Asterales genera
Flora of North America
Flora of Japan